The 2022–23 UEFA Youth League knockout phase began on 7 February 2023 with the play-off round and end with the final on 24 April 2023 at Colovray Stadium in Nyon, Switzerland, to decide the champions of the 2022–23 UEFA Youth League. All matches are played across 90 minutes and penalty shoot-out if necessary.

Times are CET/CEST, as listed by UEFA (local times, if different, are in parentheses).

Qualified teams

Domestic Champions Path

Schedule

Bracket

Play-offs

Summary

The eight second round winners from the Domestic Champions Path were drawn against the eight group runners-up from the UEFA Champions League Path, with the teams from the Domestic Champions Path hosting the match. Teams from the same association could not be drawn against each other.

The draw was conducted on 8 November 2022 at the UEFA headquarters in Nyon. The play-offs were played over one leg on 7 and 8 February 2023.

|}

Matches

Round of 16

Summary

The draw was conducted on 13 February 2023 at 13:00 CET in the UEFA headquarters in Nyon. The round of 16 was played over one leg on 28 February and 1 March 2023.

|}

Matches

Quarter-finals

Summary

The draw was conducted on 13 February 2023 at 13:00 CET in the UEFA headquarters in Nyon. The quarter-finals were played over one leg on 14 and 15 March 2023.

|}

Matches

Semi-finals

Summary

The draw was conducted on 13 February 2023 at 13:00 CET in the UEFA headquarters in Nyon. The semi-finals will be played over one leg on 21 April 2023. All four teams are qualified to the semi-finals for the first time ever, ensuring a fourth different champions in a row.

|}

Matches

Final

The final will be played on 24 April 2023 at Colovray Stadium, Nyon.

Notes

References

External links

UEFA Youth League Matches: 2022–23, UEFA.com

3
February 2023 sports events in Europe
March 2023 sports events in Europe
April 2023 sports events in Europe